George McIver (12 June 1859 – 1945) was a Scottish born Australian science fiction writer.

In 1894 Neuroomia: A New Continent: A Manuscript Delivered from the Deep was published which offers an account of the discovery of a high-tech society of Martians who had been sent to earth due to overcrowding on Mars.

References

External links

1859 births
1945 deaths
Australian science fiction writers